Melissa Hurtado (born March 6, 1988) is an American politician serving in the California State Senate. A Democrat, she represents the 16th Senate District, which encompasses Bakersfield, Kings County, and parts of Tulare County. Prior to being elected to the State Senate, she served on the Sanger City Council.

Hurtado was first elected to the State Senate in November 2018, defeating incumbent Republican Andy Vidak.

On July 7, 2020, Hurtado was selected to serve on then-candidate Joe Biden's National Latino Leadership Committee. In 2022, Hurtado ran for election in the redrawn 16th district, winning with 50.01% of the vote.

References

External links 
 
 Campaign website
 
 Melissa Hurtado

1988 births
21st-century American politicians
21st-century American women politicians
Democratic Party California state senators
California State University, Sacramento alumni
Hispanic and Latino American state legislators in California
Hispanic and Latino American women in politics
Living people
California Democrats
People from Fresno, California
People from Sanger, California
Women city councillors in California
Women state legislators in California